Michael Tse Tin-wah (born 15 July 1967) is a Hong Kong actor and singer.

Background
Michael Tse graduated from TVB's Dance Training Class and worked with TVB as a dancer for five years. He then left TVB and formed a boy band group called 風火海 (Wind Fire Sea) with Jordan Chan and Jason Chu. Two CDs were then released in 1994 and 1995 accordingly by the boy band group.

In 1996's Young and Dangerous(古惑仔), Tse acted as a character called "Tai Tin Yee" in the triad genre. The film was a huge success, which led to nine sequels and spinoffs before the series concluded in 2000. The boy band group was dismissed later then.

Tse participated Hong Kong's first modern musical Snow.Wolf.Lake (雪狼湖) in 1997. In 1998, Tse participated in the TV series A Kindred Spirit and officially becoming a TVB artist/ television actor. He was featured as the important supporting actor in many TV dramas like Detective Investigation Files (1999), Virtues of Harmony (2001–2003, 2003–2005) and Legal Entanglement (2002).

Breakout role
His breakout role was that of Man King-leung in the TVB drama series La Femme Desperado (2006), which gained him his popularity with the audience. In 2007, he was cast as the leading role of Ho Yee in the TV series Best Bet.

Also in 2007, he participated in the joint partnership production between TVB and Henan TV spinoff of BBC's Strictly Come Dancing (舞動奇跡), and was the winner. Other TVB participants included Joe Ma (馬德鐘), Carlo Ng (吳家樂), Mandy Cho (曹敏莉), Sharon Chan (陳敏之), Sonija Kwok (郭羨妮), Shirley Yeung(楊思琦), and others totaling a group of 5 females and 5 males competing against the 5 females and 5 males from the Henan TV side.

Laughing Gor
His performance as undercover cop "Laughing Gor" in E.U. became a breakout character. His Role "Laughing Gor" became very popular with netizens and audiences of E.U.. Due to his popularity, a prequel/spin-off film of E.U. featuring "Laughing Gor", entitled Turning Point, was produced.

Continuing popularity enabled the production of a 30-episode sequel series, Lives of Omission, in 2011 and a film sequel titled Turning Point 2 began filming in October 2011 and was released on 29 December 2011. Lives of Omission also won the TVB Anniversary Award for Best Drama at the 2011 TVB Anniversary Awards.

Departing TVB for a second time
After the arrival of rival broadcasters Hong Kong Television Network, many TVB stars went on to join HKTV. After months of speculation whether Michael was going to join his former celebrities, he decided to not to renew his contract with TVB which expired on 30 June. Michael insists talks were amicable and will continue his working relationship with TVB as there will be more opportunities in the future.

Since announcing his departure with TVB, Michael has openly expressed his disappointment in not winning the TVB Best Actor award in 2011 with his breakout role, Laughing Gor, which led many to believe the main reason why Michael did not extend his contract. Rumors speculated that he would join either Eric Tsang or Ricky Wong promotional company but instead Michael set up his own company, The Laughing Workshop, to focus on more the Mainland market.

Call Me By Fire 
In 2021, he joined the cast of Call Me By Fire as a contestant.

Controversy
In December 2008, Michael Tse was involved in a car accident in the West Harbour Crossing and was arrested for drunk driving after an alcohol content examination.
On 11 March 2009, he was found guilty at Eastern Magistracy and is sentenced to six weeks imprisonment with one year probation and fined $9500. His driving license was also suspended for eighteen months.

Filmography

TV series

Film

Film and TV series theme songs
 I'm the Boss (我話事), theme song for Young and Dangerous (1996)
 Blade Light Sword Shadow (刀光劍影) with Ekin Cheng, sub theme song for Young and Dangerous (1996)
 100% Girl (百分之百的女孩), sub theme song for Young and Dangerous (1996)
 Confidant Myself (知己 自己) with Ekin Cheng, theme song for Young and Dangerous 2 (1996)
 Cunning (古古惑惑) with Jason Chu and Jerry Lamb, sub theme song for Young and Dangerous 2 (1996)
 Love Today Went Through (愛情今天經過), sub theme song for Growing Up (1996)
 The Era of Eating and Drinking (吃喝時代), theme song for God of Cookery (1999)
 Black and White Rhythm (黑白變奏) with Ron Ng and Sammul Chan, theme song for E.U. (2009).
 Savour (細味), theme song for The Season of Fate (2010).
 A Man's Diary (大丈夫日記) with Michael Miu, theme song for My Better Half (2010).
 I Will Wait For You (我等你) with Kate Tsui, sub theme song for Relic of an Emissary (2011).
 Walk Alone (獨行), theme song for Lives of Omission (2011)
 Center Point (中心點) with Niki Chow, theme song for Sergeant Tabloid (2012)
 Return Heart (還心) with Ma Zihan, theme song for Hero (2012)
 Seemingly Imaginary Life (疑幻人生) with Sammy Leung, theme song for Friendly Fire (2012)
 Life of Attack (狙擊人生), theme song for Sniper Standoff (2013)
Bro (一起衝一起闖), with Ekin Cheng, Jordan Chan, Chin Ka-lok and Jerry Lamb, theme song for Golden Job (2018)

References

External links

Michael Tse Tin-Wah at the Hong Kong Movie Database
 
|-
! colspan="3" style="background: #DAA520;" | TVB Anniversary Awards
|-

|-
! colspan="3" style="background: #DAA520;" | Power Academy Awards
|-

1967 births
Living people
Hong Kong male film actors
Hong Kong male singers
Hong Kong male television actors
Chinese male dancers
TVB veteran actors
20th-century Hong Kong male actors
21st-century Hong Kong male actors